Sullivan Correctional Facility is a New York State maximum security prison correctional facility for male prisoners located in Fallsburg, New York. It is operated by the New York State Department of Correctional Services.

Sullivan is located on an 850-acre (3.4 km2) stretch of land that also contains Woodbourne Correctional Facility, a medium-security prison. The state appropriated funding for Sullivan after the loss of Rikers Island as a state facility in 1980 (the facility was returned to New York City). The buildings were built on a sharp upslope overlooking the Neversink River valley.

In order to build access roads to the prison, the New York State Department of Correctional Services purchased the Lebowitz Pine View Hotel, the 62 acre (0.25 km2) adjoining property, in 1983. Originally, some prisoners from the Woodburne facility were transferred and housed in the hotel buildings, which were operated as a Woodburne annex until the completion of Sullivan in 1985. It operated as a minimum security Sullivan annex until 2010 when the annex portion was closed.

Sullivan houses between 560 and 580 inmates in four pods, arranged in a circle. Eighty-six percent of those inmates are being incarcerated for committing violent felonies, and 60% are serving life sentences

Hudson Link for Higher Education in Prison, a not-for-profit organization was founded to provide college education to incarcerated people in an effort to help reduce recidivism and poverty, while strengthening families and communities. In 1998, as part of the get-tough-on-crime campaign, state and federal funding for college programs inside prison was stopped. Understanding the positive effects of education in the transformation and rehabilitation of incarcerated people, inmates at Sing Sing Correctional Facility reached out to religious and academic volunteers to develop a college-degree granting program. Under the leadership of Dr. Anne Reissner, Hudson Link for Higher Education in Prison was founded to restore college education at Sing Sing through private funding. Hudson Link now runs pre-college and college degree programs at Fishkill, Greene, Sing Sing, Sullivan, and Taconic Correctional Facilities.

Notable inmates

Among the more infamous inmates at Sullivan:
David Berkowitz, the "Son of Sam" serial killer who terrorized New York City in 1977, serving 6 life sentences in Shawangunk Correctional Facility
Robert Chambers, the "Preppie Killer” serving a 19-year sentence on a drug charge. Chambers is housed at Shawangunk Correctional Facility.
Arthur Shawcross, the Genesee River Killer, died November 10, 2008.
Joe "Mad Dog" Sullivan, a mob hitman
Glen D. Race, Canadian serial killer
Ronald DeFeo, Jr. killed his entire family and sparked the writing of The Amityville Horror. Serving 6 concurrent sentences of 25 years to life, he died on March 15, 2021.
Bernard (Dovie) Mutterperl, attempted to kidnap and sexually assault an underage girl. Sentenced to 10 years, released in 2017.
Abraham Hirschfeld, New York parking garage magnate convicted of hiring a hitman to kill his business partner of 40 years.  Sentenced to 3 years, served 2.  Released in 2002.
Nicholas Brooks, killed his girlfriend Sylvie Cachay, sentenced to 25 years to life.
Larme Price, serial killer who murdered four immigrants in New York in 2003 in revenge for the September 11 attacks, serving 150 years without parole.

References

External links 
 NY prison information
 Birds eye view from Microsoft Visual Earth @ Live.com

Prisons in New York (state)
Fallsburg, New York
1985 establishments in New York (state)